Married ? is a 1926 silent film comedy directed by George Terwilliger and starring Owen Moore and Constance Bennett. It was distributed by small silent studio Renown Pictures.

Prints are held at the Library of Congress, Museum of Modern Art, UCLA Film and Television Archive and George Eastman House.

Cast
Owen Moore as Dennis Shawn
Constance Bennett as Marcia Livingston
Evangeline Russell as Kate Pinto
Julia Hurley as Madame Du Pont
Nick Thompson as Joe Pinto
Antrim Short as Chuck English
Helen Burch as 7-11 Sadie
John Costello as Judge Tracey
Betty Hilburn as Mary Jane Paul
Rafaela Ottiano as Maid
Gordon Standing as Clark Jessup
Frank Walsh as Harvey Williams

References

External links
 Married ? at IMDb.com

1926 films
American silent feature films
1926 comedy films
American black-and-white films
Films directed by George Terwilliger
Silent American comedy films
1920s American films